Anthony Harding may refer to:

Anthony Harding (diver) (born 2000), British diver
Anthony John "Tony" Harding (1942–2014),  British illustrator
Anthony Harding (archaeologist) (born 1946), British archaeologist

See also
Antony Harding, British musician